Bebearia barombina, the large green forester, is a butterfly in the family Nymphalidae. It is found in eastern Nigeria, Cameroon, the Republic of the Congo, the Central African Republic and the south-western part of the Democratic Republic of the Congo. The habitat consists of forests.

Adults feed on fallen fruit.

References

Butterflies described in 1896
barombina
Butterflies of Africa
Taxa named by Otto Staudinger